Jaime E. Esparza (born 1956/1957) is an American lawyer who has served as the United States attorney for the Western District of Texas since December 2022.

Education

Esparza received a Bachelor of Business Administration from the University of Texas at Austin in 1979 and a Juris Doctor from the University of Houston Law Center in 1983.

Career 

From 1983 to 1987, Esparza served as an assistant district attorney in the Harris County District Attorney's Office in Houston; also in 1987 he served as an assistant district attorney for the 34th Judicial District of Texas. From 1988 to 1991, he was a first assistant public defender for the El Paso County Public Defender's Office and in 1992, he served as an assistant county attorney in the El Paso County Attorney's Office. From 1993 to 2020, Esparza served as the district attorney for the 34th Judicial District of Texas.

U.S. attorney for the Western District of Texas 

On October 14, 2022, President Joe Biden announced his intent to nominate Esparza to be the United States attorney for the Western District of Texas. On November 14, 2022, his nomination was sent to the United States Senate. On December 1, 2022, his nomination was reported out of committee by a voice vote. On December 6, 2022, his nomination was confirmed in the Senate by voice vote. He was sworn in by District Judge Alia Moses on December 9, 2022. Esparza was recommended to the post by Senators John Cornyn and Ted Cruz. He was also recommended and endorsed by Congresswoman Veronica Escobar.

References

1950s births
Living people
20th-century American lawyers
21st-century American lawyers
Year of birth missing (living people)
Place of birth missing (living people)
District attorneys in Texas
Public defenders
Texas lawyers
United States Attorneys for the Western District of Texas
University of Houston Law Center alumni
University of Texas at Austin alumni